Sobral de Monte Agraço is a parish in Sobral de Monte Agraço Municipality in Portugal. The population in 2011 was 3,406, in an area of 8.70 km².

References

Freguesias of Sobral de Monte Agraço
Populated places in Lisbon District